Hollytrees Museum is a free to visit, publicly owned museum in the centre of Colchester and close to Colchester Castle. It is situated in an eighteenth-century house ("Hollytrees"), which was used as a private residence until 1929, when it became a museum.

The first house on the site, known as "Symnells" after its owner, was later bought by the Shaw family, and passed from John Shaw to John Shaw III and John Shaw IV. When he died a minor, the house passed into chancery; his mother Jane Lessingham bought it but soon died. The modern house was constructed in for Elizabeth Cornelisen, who had bought the site from Lessingham's executors and promptly tore down the existing structure in poor condition. Construction commenced on 10 May 1718 at a cost of £630 plus brickwork and tiling; the total refurbishment was estimated to have cost £2,000.  She died soon after, bequeathing the house to her niece, Sarah Creffeild (née Webster), who left it to her second husband Charles Gray. It was, at that time, known as "Esqr Creffield's ". Possession of the house reverted to the Creffeilds; through Thamer Creffeild to James Round, who left to his brother Charles, who left it to his son Charles Gray Round, who left to it to his nephew James Round. The Rounds finally sold it to the Corporation of Colchester in 1922, a purchase paid for privately by Viscount Cowdray and his wife. It became a museum in 1929.

The house is known as Hollytrees after two holly trees planted in the grounds by Charles Gray in 1729 and is now a free to visit museum serving the centre of Colchester and specialising in local history. It is a grade I listed building.

Ownership 
The new house, constructed in 1718, was passed down through the family, as described above. Only those greyed out did not at some time own Hollytrees. It was finally sold by Lt. Col. Charles Round in 1922.

References

External links
 Hollytrees Museum and Visitor Information Centre - Colchester & Ipswich Museums
 Hollytrees Museum - Visit Colchester

Buildings and structures in Colchester (town)
Museums in Essex
History museums in Essex
Local museums in Essex
Museums established in 1929
1929 establishments in England
Grade I listed buildings in Essex